Big Brother Naija Season 5 also known as Big Brother Naija: Lockdown was the fifth season of the Nigerian version of the reality show Big Brother. It premiered on 19 July 2020 on Africa Magic and the live feed on DStv channel 198 and GOtv channel 29. Ex-housemate Ebuka Obi-Uchendu from season one returned as host.

The winner of this season is Laycon and he won ₦85 million worth of prizes.

Auditions
Due to the COVID-19 pandemic, a virtual audition was held to select contestants for the show. Video submissions were received from 20 May to 30 May 2020. During the submission, interested contestants submitted a two-minute video stating why they should appear on the show. At the end of the online audition, over 30,000 contestants showed their interest. Of the 30,000 contestants that showed interest, 20 Housemates were selected.

Nomination and eviction voting format 
In the previous season of Big Brother Naija, housemates nominated two of their fellow housemates for eviction and the public then voted for the housemates they wanted to save. In that format, the housemate received the fewest votes would be evicted. In this season, the nomination and eviction format was reversed for the first half only.

Each week, all housemates, except the Head of House and Deputy Head of House, face the public vote. Public voting is opened every Monday night after the Head of House Game and closes on that week's Thursday night. The four housemates who receive the fewest votes will be nominated for eviction by the housemates.

During the live eviction shows every Sunday, the nominated housemates at risk face a Diary Eviction Votes Session to determine who among them will be evicted. In the Diary Room, each housemate votes on one or two of the bottom four housemates who they want to leave. The housemate who receives the most votes is then evicted.

During the sixth live eviction show on Day 42, the host Ebuka announced that the voting system would be switching back to the old one, with housemates nominating who they want to evict and the public voting who among these housemates to evict.

Housemates 

The launch night is marked as Day 0. The day after is Day 1.

Public nomination percentages
The public was voted for their favourite housemate. Voting starts on Monday and closes on Thursday. On Sunday's live eviction show, only housemates at the bottom have been revealed.

Full percentages were revealed on 1 October 2020 on the official website.

Voting history & nominations table

Notes

 : During the eviction show on Day 14, the host Ebuka announced that two housemates will be evicted from the house.
 : Only one housemate was evicted rather than two during the eviction show.
 : As the vote was a tie between Praise and Wathoni, the Head of House, Kiddwaya, must cast a tie-breaker vote (in bold). He voted for Praise.
 : During the sixth live eviction show, Ebuka announced a twist that a triple eviction will occur and housemates did not vote to evict in the Diary Room like in prior weeks. Evictions were only based on the voting percentages of favourite housemate voting by the public. At the end of the show, the host announced another twist that starting from Day 43, the voting format was changed back to the old one, with housemates nominating and the public voting to evict.
 : Erica was ejected from the house on Day 49 for disregarding the rules and the show's process.
 : For Week 9's nomination, the housemates were divided into two teams, with membership determined through a random draw.  Team Black: Dorathy, Neo, and Ozo.  Team White: Laycon, Trikytee, and Vee. The Head of House, Nengi, does not belong to any team. Each team directly nominated two housemates from the other team for eviction.

References

External links 
 Official site

Nigeria
2020 Nigerian television seasons